What Happens Here, Stays Here (also referred to as What Happens in Vegas, Stays in Vegas) is a slogan and advertising campaign for the city of Las Vegas, Nevada.

Background

The original slogan was created in 2003 by the Las Vegas Convention and Visitors Authority and advertising agency R&R Partners. The idea was to brand Las Vegas as more than a gambling destination, promoting adult freedom and empowerment.

In popular culture

When the "What Happens Here, Stays Here" ads debuted in February 2003, they became an almost instant "cultural phenomenon" according to Advertising Age. The phrase was referenced by numerous pop culture mainstays, including Saturday Night Live, Meet the Press, Jeopardy!, Wheel of Fortune, the Academy Awards, and others. Two years after the campaign debuted, then-First Lady, Laura Bush, used the tagline in a discussion with Jay Leno on The Tonight Show. A survey in USA Today called the campaign the "most effective" of 2003. 

The slogan became the name of the 2008 American comedy What Happens in Vegas. It also inspired a song of the same name by Usher, as well as the film series The Hangover.

See also
When in Rome, do as the Romans do

References 

Advertising campaigns
American advertising slogans
2003 neologisms
Culture of Las Vegas